The  or  (Dutch), usually shortened to the Place Rogier, or Rogier by locals, is a major square in the Brussels municipality of Saint-Josse-ten-Noode, Belgium. It is named in honour of Charles Rogier, a former Prime Minister of Belgium who played a great political role during the Belgian Revolution of 1830.

The square is located on the transition between Brussels' historic city centre (the Pentagon) and the Northern Quarter business district (also called Little Manhattan), an exponent of modern Brussels. It is an important communication node in the city both in terms of road network and public transport. Many hotels, offices and shops adjoin it. The Rue Neuve/Nieuwstraat, Belgium's second busiest shopping street, also ends there. It is served by the metro and premetro (underground tram) station Rogier on lines 2, 3, 4 and 6.

History

Early history
The square was originally known as the / ("Nations Square") or the / ("Cologne Square"). In 1885, following the death of the liberal statesman and former Prime Minister of Belgium, Charles Rogier, it was renamed the / ("Charles Rogier Square") in his honour.

Until 1952, the original Brussels-North railway station was located on the Place Charles Rogier. With the commissioning of the North–South connection, this terminus station was replaced, further north, by the current transit station. The old station building was demolished in 1955. The  Rogier International Center, also called the Martini Tower, was erected in 1960 on the former site of the station, and housed the National Theatre of Belgium until 1999. The building was demolished in 2001, and replaced by the  Rogier Tower.

Redevelopment (2008–2017)
In 2006, the Brussels-Capital Region decided to completely redevelop the square. The renovation lasted from 2008 to 2017, with most of the work carried out between 2013 and 2015. The project was the subject of an international architectural competition, with some of the entrances to the metro station also being opened and renovated.

Above the station, a large parasol-shaped translucent awning was built according to plans by the architect Xaveer De Geyter.

Location and accessibility
The Place Charles Rogier lies at the conjunction of the / to south with two smaller streets on its northern side; the / and the /. Additionally, two sides streets lead into it from the north-west and north-east; the / and the /.

Notable buildings
The Place Charles Rogier is home to an important architectural heritage:
 the Crowne Plaza Brussels - Le Palace (formerly Palace Hôtel) (1909), Art Nouveau hotel by Adhémar Lener
 the Hotel Indigo Brussels - City (formerly Hôtel Albert I) (1929), Art Deco hotel by Michel Polak and Albert Poor
 the Hôtel Siru (1932), Art Deco or early modernist hotel by Marcel Chabot
 the Manhattan Center (1972), functionalist building by Louis Van Hove
 the Rogier Tower (formerly Dexia Tower), completed in 2006 on the site of the Rogier International Center, by Philippe Samyn and Partners and M. & J-M. Jaspers - J. Eyers & Partners
 the Covent Garden (2004–07), postmodern building by Henri Montois

See also

 Central Boulevards of Brussels
 Art Nouveau in Brussels
 Art Deco in Brussels
 History of Brussels
 Belgium in "the long nineteenth century"

References

Notes

Squares in Brussels
Saint-Josse-ten-Noode
19th century in Brussels